Killeigh (meaning "church of the field") is a village in County Offaly, Ireland.

Killeigh was the birthplace of racing greyhound 'Mick the Miller', and a statue has been placed on the village green to commemorate this dog.

See also
 List of towns and villages in Ireland

References

External links
 History of Killeigh (archived)

Towns and villages in County Offaly